Safarbek Malsagov (1868–1944) was a Russian general. He was born in what is now the Republic of North Ossetia-Alania. After the end of the Russian Civil War, he went into exile in Poland.

Awards
Order of Saint Vladimir, 4th class
Order of Saint Vladimir, 3rd class
Order of Saint Anna, 1st class
Order of Saint Anna, 2nd class
Order of Saint Anna, 3rd class
Order of Saint Anna, 4th class
Order of Saint Stanislaus (House of Romanov), 1st class
Order of Saint Stanislaus (House of Romanov), 2nd class
Order of Saint Stanislaus (House of Romanov), 3rd class

1868 births
1944 deaths
People from Vladikavkaz
Imperial Russian Army generals
Russian military personnel of World War I
People of the Russian Civil War
Recipients of the Order of St. Vladimir, 3rd class
Recipients of the Order of St. Vladimir, 4th class
Recipients of the Order of St. Anna, 1st class
Recipients of the Order of St. Anna, 2nd class
Recipients of the Order of St. Anna, 3rd class
Recipients of the Order of St. Anna, 4th class
Recipients of the Order of Saint Stanislaus (Russian), 1st class
Recipients of the Order of Saint Stanislaus (Russian), 2nd class
Recipients of the Order of Saint Stanislaus (Russian), 3rd class
Russian untitled nobility